Song Dong-wook (born August 20, 1962 in Seoul) is a former tennis player from South Korea, who represented his native country at the 1988 Summer Olympics in Seoul. There he was defeated in the first round by America's eventual runner up Tim Mayotte. The right-hander reached his highest singles ATP-ranking on April 27, 1987, when he became the number 352 of the world.

External links
 

1962 births
Living people
South Korean male tennis players
Tennis players at the 1988 Summer Olympics
Olympic tennis players of South Korea
Asian Games medalists in tennis
Tennis players at the 1982 Asian Games
Tennis players at the 1986 Asian Games
Asian Games gold medalists for South Korea
Asian Games silver medalists for South Korea
Medalists at the 1982 Asian Games
Medalists at the 1986 Asian Games
20th-century South Korean people